The Russian basketball league system is a hierarchical league system for professional basketball clubs in Russia,  with promotion and relegation between different levels of competition. There are currently five levels of competition: the VTB United League, the Russian Super League 1, the Russian Super League 2, the Russian Super League 3 and the Under-23 Youth League.

The tier pyramid

Other competitions
Russian Cup
Soviet Union Cup

See also
League system
European professional club basketball system
Spanish basketball league system
Greek basketball league system
Italian basketball league system
French basketball league system
Turkish basketball league system
German basketball league system
Serbian basketball league system
Polish basketball league system
Hungarian basketball league system
South American professional club basketball system

References

External links
Eurobasket.com Russian Men's Basketball
VTB United League Official Website
Russian Professional Basketball League Official Website
Russian Basketball Federation Official Website

Basketball league systems